The Ohio Valley Emmy Awards are a division of the National Academy of Television Arts and Sciences. The Columbus, Ohio division was founded in 1964. In addition to granting the Ohio Valley Emmy Awards, this division awards scholarships, honors industry veterans at the Silver Circle Celebration, conducts National Student Television Awards of Excellence, has a free research and a nationwide job bank. The chapter also participates in judging Emmy entries at the regional and national levels.

Boundaries

The academy is divided into the following boundaries and encompasses the states of Ohio, Indiana, Kentucky and West Virginia. These boundaries are responsible for the submission of television broadcast materials presented for awards considerations.

Board of governors

Each year the membership of the National Academy of Television Arts & Sciences Ohio Valley Chapter elects new professionals on a two-year rotating Board of Governors to represent the Ohio Valley community.

The Board of Governors is a working board which work together collaboratively to ensure the best interests of the membership.

Emmy award winners

Emmy award winners are individuals who show excellence in the field of television. The Emmys are held to the same esteem as the Oscar Awards are to motion pictures or the Grammy Awards are to the music industry.

References

Regional Emmy Awards
Awards established in 1964
1964 establishments in Ohio